The Middle Atlantic PGA Championship is a golf tournament that is the championship of the Middle Atlantic section of the PGA of America. The tournament has been played annually since 1932 in Virginia, Maryland, or Washington, DC.  Fred Funk, eight-time winner on the PGA Tour, holds the record with six Middle Atlantic PGA victories.  Other PGA Tour winners who have also won the Middle Atlantic PGA Championship include Chandler Harper (seven time PGA tour winner and 1950 PGA Championship winner), Bobby Cruickshank (17-time PGA tour winner), Lew Worsham (four-time PGA tour winner), and George Fazio (two-time PGA tour winner and golf course designer).

Winners

References

External links
PGA of America – Middle Atlantic section
MAPGA Professional Championship 2000s
MAPGA Professional Championship 1970–1999
MAPGA Professional Championship 1940–1969
MAPGA Professional Championship 1925–1939

Golf in Maryland
Golf in Virginia
Golf in Washington, D.C.
PGA of America sectional tournaments
Recurring sporting events established in 1932
1932 establishments in Maryland